For the Many is the nineteenth studio album by English reggae band UB40. It was released on 15 March 2019 on the Shoestring record label. The album cover was designed by the band's saxophonist Brian Travers and depicts a silhouette of tower blocks, following the 2017 Grenfell Tower fire. The album's name has been associated with the Labour Party and its leader Jeremy Corbyn's use of the slogan "For the many, not the few". Travers commented on the connection in an article published in a Birmingham Live article, stating, "We're all socialists and Labour supporters".

For the Many is the band's first album of original material to feature vocalist Duncan Campbell and drummer Jimmy Brown said in an Anti-music interview, "It's our first original album with Duncan, and a true reflection of where the band are at right now. It gave us an opportunity to go back to our roots and draw on the 1970s-style reggae that inspired us to be in a band in the first place." A limited edition 2-CD version of the album was also released, featuring the standard album and a second CD of dub mixes of the album's tracks.

The album peaked at #29 on the official U.K. album charts.

Track listing

Personnel

UB40
 Jimmy Brown – drums
 Duncan Campbell – lead vocals
 Robin Campbell – vocals, guitars, vocal arrangements; lead vocal on "The Keeper"
 Earl Falconer – bass; lead vocal on "What Happened to UB40?" and "Bulldozer"
 Norman Lamont Hassan – percussion, vocals; lead vocal on "Broken Man", "Moonlight Lover" and "All We Do Is Cry"
 Brian Travers – alto, tenor and baritone saxophones, WKS, horn arrangements
 Laurence Parry – trumpet, trombone, flugelhorn
 Martin Meredith – alto saxophone, additional keyboards and programming
 Tony Mullings – keyboards

Additional personnel
 Gilly G – vocal on "Moonlight Lover"
 Hunterz – vocal on "All We Do Is Cry"
 Kabaka Pyramid – vocal on "Broken Man"
 Pablo Rider – vocal on "I'm Alright Jack"
 Slinger – vocal on "Gravy Train"

Charts

References

2019 albums
UB40 albums
Reggae albums